The Battle of the North Cape was a Second World War naval battle that occurred on 26 December 1943, as part of the Arctic campaign. The , on an operation to attack Arctic convoys of war materiel from the western Allies to the Soviet Union, was brought to battle and sunk by the Royal Navy's battleship  with cruisers and destroyers, including an onslaught from the destroyer  of the exiled Royal Norwegian Navy, off the North Cape, Norway.

The battle was the last between big-gun capital ships in the war between Britain and Germany. The British victory confirmed the massive strategic advantage held by the British, at least in surface units. It was also the penultimate engagement between battleships in history, the last being the October 1944 Battle of Surigao Strait.

Background
Since August 1941, the western Allies had run convoys of ships from the United Kingdom and Iceland to the northern ports of the Soviet Union to provide essential supplies for their war effort on the Eastern Front. These endured much hardship, frequently attacked by German naval and air forces stationed in occupied Norway. Even the threat of these ships' presence was enough to cause disastrous consequences for the convoys, such as Convoy PQ 17 that was scattered and mostly sunk by German forces after false reports of the Tirpitz sailing to intercept them. To ward off the threat of Germany's capital ships in the Arctic and to escort convoys with a high level of success, the Royal Navy had to outlay great assets.

Operation Ostfront was an attempt by the German Kriegsmarine to intercept the expected Arctic convoys.

Escorting the convoys to Russia was the responsibility of the Home Fleet and its commander-in-chief, Admiral Sir Bruce Fraser. Fraser wished to neutralise Scharnhorst, a major threat to the convoys, and planned a confrontation over Christmas 1943 in which convoy JW 55B would be used to draw the enemy out. Fraser expected and hoped that Scharnhorst would attempt to attack JW 55B.  At a conference of the captains of the ships in his force Fraser described his plan to intercept Scharnhorst at a position between the convoy and the enemy's Norwegian base. He would then approach the enemy to within  in the Arctic night, illuminate Scharnhorst with star shell, and open fire using .

Convoy JW 55B had left Loch Ewe on 20 December and was sighted two days later by a Luftwaffe aircraft which commenced shadowing. By 23 December it was clear to the British from intelligence reports that the convoy had been sighted and was being shadowed by enemy aircraft. Fraser was anxious not to discourage Scharnhorst from leaving its base, so did not approach before it was necessary to do so. Scharnhorst set course for the convoy's reported position as a south-westerly gale developed.

Battle

Fraser received confirmation from the Admiralty in the early hours of 26 December that Scharnhorst was at sea and searching for convoy JW 55B. The stormy weather had resulted in the grounding of all Luftwaffe reconnaissance planes. With no ability to search for the British ships from the air and heavy seas hampering the movement of his ships, Rear Admiral Bey was unable to locate the convoy. Despite a German U-boat spotting the convoy and reporting its position, Bey was still not able to make contact with the British ships. Thinking he had overshot the enemy, he detached his destroyers and sent them southward to increase the search area, and the destroyers subsequently lost contact with their flagship. Fraser, preparing for the German attack, had diverted the returning empty convoy RA 55A northward, out of the area in which it was expected, and ordered JW 55B to reverse course to allow him to close.

The unescorted Scharnhorst encountered Burnett's Force 1 shortly after 09:00. Belfast was the first ship to obtain radar contact on Scharnhorst, and the British cruisers rapidly closed the range. While no hits were scored on the British ships, the German battleship was struck twice, with one shell destroying the forward Seetakt radar controls and leaving Scharnhorst virtually blind in a mounting snowstorm. Without radar, gunners aboard the German battleship were forced to aim at the enemy's muzzle flashes. This was made more difficult because two of the British cruisers were using a new flashless propellant. Bey, believing he had engaged a battleship, turned south in an attempt to distance himself from the pursuers and perhaps draw them away from the convoy.

Scharnhorst's superior speed allowed Bey to shake off his pursuers, after which he turned northeast in an attempt to circle round them and attack the undefended convoy. It was a decision that he had some personal doubts about as it would result in the cruisers losing contact with Scharnhorst, and the decision was criticised by some of the British force's other officers but supported by Fraser. To Burnett's relief, shortly after noon, Scharnhorst was once again detected by the cruiser's radars as it attempted to approach the convoy. As fire was again exchanged, Scharnhorst scored two hits on Norfolk with 11-inch shells, disabling a turret and her radar. Burnett's destroyers were also unable to get close enough to Scharnhorst to launch a torpedo attack on the German ship. Following this exchange, Bey decided to return to port, while he ordered his destroyers to attack the convoy at a position reported by the U-boat earlier in the morning. The reported position was out of date, and the destroyers missed the convoy.

Scharnhorst ran south for several hours, once again taking advantage of its superior speed. Burnett pursued, but both Sheffield and Norfolk suffered engine problems and were forced to drop back, leaving the outgunned Belfast as the sole pursuer and dangerously exposed for a while. The lack of working radar aboard Scharnhorst prevented the Germans from taking advantage of the situation, allowing Belfast to reacquire the German ship on her radar set. Bey was unaware that his ship was now sailing into a trap, with Admiral Fraser's main force steaming towards Scharnhorst's position and perfectly placed to intercept the fleeing German ship. With Belfast sending a constant stream of radio signals on the Scharnhorst's position, the battleship Duke of York battled through the rough seas to reach the German ship. Fraser sent his four escorting destroyers to press ahead and try to get into torpedo-launching positions. The main British force soon picked up Scharnhorst on radar at 16:15 and were manoeuvring to bring a full broadside to bear.

At 16:48, Belfast fired star shells to illuminate Scharnhorst which was unprepared, with her turrets trained fore and aft, and clearly visible from Duke of York. Scharnhorst was now being engaged on one side by Duke of York and Jamaica while Burnett's cruisers engaged from the other side. The Germans took continuing heavy punishment from Duke of York's 14-inch shells, and at 17:24 a desperate Bey signalled to Germany "am surrounded by heavy units".

Bey was able to put some more distance between Scharnhorst and the British ships to increase his prospects of success. Two 11-inch shells from one of her salvoes passed through the masts of the Duke of York, severing some of the wireless aerials, and, more serious still, knocking over the radar aerial to the Type 284 gunnery control radar set. These hits could not have been known to Bey, and Lt. Harold Bates RNVR, the electrical officer, despite the appalling conditions (a force 8 gale, darkness and substantial ice), climbed the mast and managed to return the aerial to the horizontal and restarted the gyro-stabiliser so that within a few minutes the radar was working again. (After the battle, a myth arose that Bates had repaired the wires with his bare hands, leading to the nickname "Barehand" Bates.) Scharnhorst'''s fortunes took a dramatic turn for the worse at 18:20 when a shell fired by Duke of York at extreme range pierced her belt armour and destroyed the No. 1 boiler room. Five minutes later, Bey sent his final radio message to the German naval command: "We will fight on until the last shell is fired." At 18:50 Scharnhorst turned to starboard to engage the destroyers Savage and Saumarez, but this allowed Scorpion and the Norwegian destroyer Stord to attack with torpedoes, scoring two hits on the starboard side. As Scharnhorst continued to turn to avoid the torpedoes, Savage and Saumarez scored three hits on her port side. Saumarez was hit several times by Scharnhorsts secondary armament and suffered 11 killed and 11 wounded.

With Scharnhorst illuminated by star shells "hanging over her like a chandelier", Duke of York and Jamaica resumed fire, at a range of only . At 19:15, Belfast joined in from the north. The British vessels subjected the German ship to a deluge of shells, and the cruisers Jamaica and Belfast fired their remaining torpedoes at the slowing target. Scharnhorsts end came when the British destroyers Opportune, Virago, Musketeer and Matchless fired a further 19 torpedoes at her. Of her total complement of 1,968, only 36 were pulled from the frigid waters, 30 by Scorpion and six by Matchless. Neither Rear Admiral Bey nor Captain Hintze were among those rescued (although both were reported seen in the water after the ship sank), nor were any other officers. Scorpion tried to rescue Bey but he foundered. British casualties, in contrast, were relatively light with only 21 killed and 11 wounded. The majority of British casualties occurred on Saumarez, with 11 of the destroyer's sailors being killed as the ship attempted to close with Scharnhorst. HMS Norfolk suffered most of the remaining casualties with seven of her men being killed while the destroyer Scorpion also had one of its men missing in action. Fraser ordered the force to proceed to Murmansk, making a signal to the Admiralty: "Scharnhorst sunk", to which the reply came: "Grand, well done."

Aftermath

Later in the evening of 26 December, Admiral Fraser briefed his officers on board Duke of York: "Gentlemen, the battle against Scharnhorst has ended in victory for us. I hope that if any of you are ever called upon to lead a ship into action against an opponent many times superior, you will command your ship as gallantly as Scharnhorst was commanded today". After the battle Admiral Fraser sent the following message to the Admiralty: "... Please convey to the C-in-C Norwegian Navy. Stord played a very daring role in the fight and I am very proud of her...". In an interview in the Evening News on 5 February 1944 the commanding officer of HMS Duke of York, Captain Guy Russell, said: "... the Norwegian destroyer Stord carried out the most daring attack of the whole action...".

The loss of Scharnhorst demonstrated the vital importance of radar in modern naval warfare.  While the German battleship should have been able to outgun all of her opponents save the battleship Duke of York, the early loss of radar-assisted fire control combined with the problem of inclement weather left her at a significant disadvantage. Scharnhorst was straddled by 31 of the 52 radar-fire-controlled salvoes fired by Duke of York. In the aftermath of the battle, the Kriegsmarine commander, Großadmiral Karl Dönitz remarked, "Surface ships are no longer able to fight without effective radar equipment."

The sinking of the Scharnhorst was a major victory for the Allied war effort in the Arctic theatre and further altered the strategic balance at sea in their favour. The Battle of the North Cape took place only a few months after the successful Operation Source, which had severely damaged the German battleship Tirpitz as she lay at anchor in Norway. With Scharnhorst'' destroyed and Germany's other battleships out of service, the Allies were now for the first time in the war free from the threat of German battleships raiding their convoys in the Arctic and Atlantic. This would allow the Allies to reallocate their naval resources that had been previously tied up to counter the threat of the German 'fleet in being'. This would prove to be the final battle of battleships in European waters and was one of few major surface actions in the Second World War without air support.

See also
 Arctic Ocean operations of World War II

Footnotes

References

Further reading

External links

 The Battleship Scharnhorst at KBismarck.com
 Scharnhorst at Ships of the World: An Historical Encyclopedia

North Cape
1943 in Norway
North Cape
North Cape
North Cape
North Cape
North Cape
December 1943 events